Iberolacerta is a genus of lizards in the family Lacertidae. The genus contains at least eight described species, which are mainly found in Spain and France. Iberolacerta horvathi (Horvath's rock lizard) has a wider geographic range, being distributed in Central Europe.

Distribution
The species of Iberolacerta are distinct and mainly found in the western Europe mountain ranges. Iberolacerta species found in Germany could have possibly been caused by human introduction, and are thus controversial. For example, I. horvathi had been encountered in southern Germany, but has not been encountered thereafter.

Morphological features
This group of lizards contains certain features in common, including: a depressed head and body; 7–9 premaxillary teeth; ~26 presacral vertebrae (for males); inscriptional ribs; tail brightly colored in hatchlings.

Some of the lizards in this genus contains specific features such as: rostral and frontonasal scales; one postanal scale; supranasal and anterior loreal scales; 36 or less macro chromosomes; egg-laid embryos somewhat developed.

Small species are up to ~85 mm long, but all species have shown to have females are larger than the male.

Skull 
The skull contains 7-9 premaxillary teeth, no pterygoid teeth, and slender nasal process. In addition there is a separation between the frontal bone and postorbital bone.

Post-cranial skeleton 
Iberolacerta contains presacral vertebrae that differ upon sex. Males presacral vertebrae can range from 25-26, white the larger females presacral vertebrae can range from 26-29. Both sex also contain an average of 6 posterior presacral vertebrae with relatively short ribs. The tail vertebrae can contain the common A-type pattern or less common B-type pattern.

Coloring 
The coloring on the dorsal side contains stripes, bands, and spots near or on where the vertebral column is located. The coloring on the ventral side are white, light yellow, deep orange, or green. The tails of juveniles are often bright green or blue.

Chromosome counts
Contains a diploid (2n) number of autosomes ranging from 36 and below. The sex chromosomes come in two different types depending on number of Z chromosomes that are species specific: ZW-type or Z1Z2W-type. The chromosomes also can contain nucleolar organizer in large macrochromosomes, termed L-type, or in a medium macrochromosome, termed M-type.

Ecology
These lizards tend to be found as solid surface rock dwellers but can be found associated with small loose stones.

Species
 Iberolacerta aranica (Aran rock lizard)
I. aranica is located in the central Pyrenean Mountains of France and Spain. The populations of this species are due to the rocky alpine habitats. The population trend of this species is decreasing. Image.
 Iberolacerta aurelioi (Aurelio's rock lizard)
I. aurelioi is located in the Pyrenees Mountains on the border of Andorra, France, and Spain. This species has a population size that ranges from approximately 10-200 individuals. The population trend for this species is decreasing. Image.
 Iberolacerta bonnali (Pyrenean rock lizard)
I. bonnali is located in the central Pyrenean Mountains of France and Spain. Populations are present in suitable habitats and fragmented in unsuitable habitats. The population trend of this species is stable. Image.
 Iberolacerta cyreni (Cyren's rock lizard)
I. cyreni is located in the central mountains of Spain in the Sierra de Bejar, Sierra de Gredos, La Serrota and Sierra del Guadarrama. Populations of this species are common in particular areas. The population trend for this species is decreasing. Image.
 Iberolacerta galani (Leonese rock lizard)
I. galani is located in the Spain regions of Sierra Segundera, Sierra de la Cabrera, Sierra del Eje or Peña Trevinca and Sierra del TelenoOscar. The populations of these species are copious. The population trend of this species is unknown. Image.
 Iberolacerta horvathi (Horvath's rock lizard)
I. horvathi is located in the mountain ranges of southern Austria, northeastern Italy, western Slovenia, and western Croatia. Populations of this species are locally copious. The population trend for this species is stable. Image.
 Iberolacerta martinezricai (Martinez-Rica's rock lizard)
I. martinezricai is located in the Spain region of Sierra Segundera, Salamanca. The populations of these species are very rare since most populations are located at the peak of the mountain. The population trend of this species is decreasing. Image.
 Iberolacerta monticola (Iberian rock lizard)
I. monticola is located in the Spain region of the Cantabrian Mountains and Galicia, also located in the central Portugal region of Serra de Estrela. The populations of these species occur when habitats are suitable, although they are very localized. The population trend of this species is decreasing. Image.

Evolution
Speciation theory caused by mountain ranges and Pleistocene glacial cycles: It is believed that many of the Iberolacerta genus had led to many speciation seen today because of the Pleistocene glacial cycles and Holocene habitat fragmentation. For example, I. monticola has been studied to determine its cause of speciation. There was an analysis of  17 I. monticola population's mitochondrial DNA sequences, at a control region and cytochrome b loci, throughout the northwestern quadrant of the Iberian Peninsula. The results these researchers data gathered lead to the conclusion that correlated to a “refugia within refugia” model since the comparative phylogeographic analyses had shown consistent genetic subdivisions patterns. This suggested that the mountain ranges could potentially be the cause of the descending species of Iberolacerta. It was also hypothesized that the Holocene epoch then represented a long-term survival inflexion point for the derived species not to survive the preceding glacial cycle.

Reproduction
During copulation the male bites and latches to the flanks of the females, allowing the fertilization of ~3–10 eggs.  In newly laid eggs the embryos are somewhat developed, and range depending on species from ~23 to 36 days until hatching.

References

External links 
 
 

 
Lizard genera
Taxa named by Oscar J. Arribas
Taxonomy articles created by Polbot